The 1992–93 United Counties League season was the 86th in the history of the United Counties League, a football competition in England.

Premier Division

The Premier Division featured 21 clubs which competed in the division last season, along with one new club:
Newport Pagnell Town, promoted from Division One

Also, Hamlet Stewart & Lloyds changed name to Stewarts & Lloyds Corby.

League table

Division One

Division One featured 17 clubs which competed in the division last season, along with one new club:
APV Peterborough City, demoted from the Premier Division, who also changed name to Peterborough City

League table

References

External links
 United Counties League

1992–93 in English football leagues
United Counties League seasons